Chiranthodendron is a flowering plant genus in the family Malvaceae. It comprises a single species of tree, Chiranthodendron pentadactylon.

Names
The tree is called the devil's, monkey's or Mexican hand tree or the hand-flower in English, the árbol de las manitas (tree of little hands) in Spanish, and mācpalxōchitl (palm flower) in Nahuatl, all on account of its distinctive red flowers, which resemble open human hands. The scientific name means "five-fingered hand-flower tree".

Description
This species is native to Guatemala and southern Mexico. On the wet slopes of these areas, trees may reach  in height. The unusual appearance of the 'hands' has stimulated cultivation in gardens around the world, primarily in North America where it grows well near its native range. The leaves are large and shallowly lobed, with a brown indumentum on the underside. The distinctive flowers appear in late spring and early summer; the five stamens are long, curved upward, and bright red, giving the distinct impression of a clawed hand.

It was originally described from a single cultivated specimen grown in Toluca in the Toluca Valley, well outside the native range. The Aztecs revered the tree.

Intergeneric hybrid
It is closely related to Fremontodendron, sufficiently to produce an intergeneric hybrid ×Chiranthofremontia lenzii n, which has yellow flowers and a reduced form of the claw.

Uses
The Aztecs and others have used solutions containing the tree's flowers as a remedy for lower abdominal pain and for heart problems. Such solutions also reduce edema and serum cholesterol levels and, because they contain the glycosides quercetin and luteolin, act as diuretics.

References

 Malvaceae info page

External links

Bombacoideae
Malvaceae genera
Monotypic Malvales genera
Flora of Mexico
Flora of Guatemala
Ornamental trees
Garden plants of North America